Pygmy parrots are the smallest members of the parrot order. The six species of pygmy parrots are all in the genus Micropsitta, which is the only genus in the Micropsittini tribe.

Pygmy parrots are native to the forests of New Guinea and nearby islands. They are tiny birds, fast-moving, and mostly green with bright highlights. A pygmy parrot spends a good deal of time climbing through foliage, using its large feet and beak, and stiffened tail feathers.

Pygmy parrots are also among the few species in the order (other examples include Pyrilia and Nannopsittaca species) that have never been successfully kept, let alone bred, in captivity. All attempts to do so have resulted in the quick deaths of the little birds. Stress and dietary deficiencies are probably to blame. Pygmy parrots are among the few birds that feed on fungi and lichens, which play a major role in their diet. Their precise dietary needs are poorly understood.

Description
They have long toes and long, curved claws. The shafts of their tail feathers are stiff and form projections at the end of the tail. The cere is prominent. The external appearance of the adult males and adult females differ to varying extents in different species. Juveniles are duller.

Taxonomy
The genus was defined by French naturalist René-Primevère Lesson in 1831. The name Micropsitta is derived from the Greek mikros meaning small and psitta for parrot.

The pygmy parrots consist of six species and several subspecies:

Genus: Micropsitta Lesson 1831 (pygmy parrots)
 M. bruijnii (Salvadori 1875), Red-breasted pygmy parrot
 M. b. bruijnii (Salvadori 1875)
 M. b. buruensis Arndt 1999
 M. b. necopinata Hartert 1925
 M. b. pileata Mayr 1940
 M. b. rosea Mayr 1940
 M. finschii (Ramsay, EP 1881), Finsch's pygmy parrot
 M. f. aolae (Ogilvie-Grant 1888)
 M. f. finschii (Ramsay, EP 1881)
 M. f. nanina (Tristram 1891)
 M. f. tristrami (Rothschild & Hartert 1902)
 M. f. viridifrons (Rothschild & Hartert 1899)
 M. geelvinkiana (Schlegel 1871), Geelvink pygmy parrot
 M. g. geelvinkiana (Schlegel 1871)
 M. g. misoriensis (Salvadori 1876)
 M. keiensis (Salvadori 1876), Yellow-capped pygmy parrot
 M. k. chloroxantha Oberholser 1917
 M. k. keiensis (Salvadori 1876)
 M. k. viridipectus (Rothschild 1911)
 M. meeki Rothschild & Hartert 1914, Meek's pygmy parrot
 M. m. meeki Rothschild & Hartert 1914
 M. m. proxima Rothschild & Hartert 1924
 M. pusio (Sclater, PL 1866), Buff-faced pygmy parrot
 M. p. beccarii (Salvadori 1876)
 M. p. harterti Mayr 1940
 M. p. pusio (Sclater, PL 1866)
 M. p. stresemanni Hartert 1926

References

External links

Psittaculinae
Taxa named by René Lesson